Pinus jaliscana, the Jalisco pine, is a species of conifer in the family Pinaceae.

It is endemic to southwestern Mexico, native to the Pacific slopes of the Sierra Madre del Sur within western Jalisco state, with populations in the Sierra de Cuale and Sierra el Tuito and south of Villa Purificación from 700 to 2,000 meters elevation. It is threatened by habitat loss.

References

Sources
 IUCN Red List of all Threatened Species

jaliscana
Endemic flora of Mexico
Trees of Jalisco
Flora of the Sierra Madre del Sur
Near threatened biota of Mexico
Taxonomy articles created by Polbot